Yuri Tracante Sousa (born 18 October 1992), commonly known as Yuri, is a retired Brazilian footballer.

Career statistics

Club

Notes

References

1992 births
Living people
Brazilian footballers
Association football midfielders
Porto Alegre Futebol Clube players
Sociedade Esportiva e Recreativa Caxias do Sul players